Arturo Michelini (17 February 1909 – 15 June 1969) was an Italian politician and secretary of the Italian Social Movement (MSI). A minor party official during the days of Italian fascism and a war veteran, Michelini emerged as one of the two leading figures in the MSI during the 1950s and 1960s, representing the moderate tendency of the party against the nostalgic fascist tendency.

Early years
Michelini was born in Florence. An accountant by profession, he was a lower to middle-ranking figure in the National Fascist Party, rising to become secretary of the party in Rome. Michelini, a pro-Franco veteran of the Spanish Civil War, served with the army on the Eastern Front during the Second World War. He was twice wounded in action and decorated with the Silver Medal of Military Valor for his efforts. He did not hold office in the Italian Social Republic.

MSI
Michelini emerged as a leading figure in the neo-fascism strain of Italian politics that emerged immediately after the war and was a prominent figure in the foundation of the MSI. He was elected to the Chamber of Deputies for Rome at the 1948 election as one of the new party's six representatives. He emerged as leader of the MSI in 1954 in succession to Augusto De Marsanich and sought to moderate the party's neo-fascism in an attempt to bring it more into the political mainstream, an endeavour in which he largely failed. He was linked to financial powers in Rome as well as the Vatican City who sought to move the MSI away from its third position rhetoric into more conservative ideals.

Michelini's policies helped to push some of the more radical elements out of the party and into such fringe groups as Avanguardia Nazionale and Ordine Nuovo. In general he disliked the unconstitutional methods of such minor groups and was the dominant figure in the "realist" tendency within the party, supporting co-operation with NATO and moves to build a pan-right alliance with the Christian Democrats and Monarchists. In this regard he faced regular internal opposition, notably from Giorgio Almirante as well as other radicals such as Ezio Maria Gray, Massimo Anderson and Pino Romualdi who all wanted the basis of the MSI to be the charter issued by the 1943 Congress of Verona. As political editor of Secolo d'Italia, Michelini was able to ensure that his position was that most widely disseminated.

Despite these attempts at moderation the MSI lost support under Michelini's leadership, dropping from 5.8% in the 1953 general election to 4.9% in the 1958 election. Michelini however was a skilled negotiator and adept at the internal politics of the MSI and at the 8th party congress in June 1965 when the pro-fascist wing formed a majority for the first time under his leadership he was able to remain in position by virtue of concluding a private deal with their leader Almirante. In this respect he was able to retain the leadership of the MSI until his death in 1969, at which point Almirante took over.

References

1909 births
1969 deaths
Politicians from Florence
Italian fascists
Italian Social Movement politicians
Deputies of Legislature I of Italy
Deputies of Legislature II of Italy
Deputies of Legislature III of Italy
Deputies of Legislature IV of Italy
Deputies of Legislature V of Italy
Italian people of the Spanish Civil War
Italian military personnel of World War II
Italian anti-communists